Kringle Domains are autonomous protein domains that fold into large loops stabilized by 3 disulfide linkages.  These are important in protein–protein interactions with blood coagulation factors.  Their name refers to the Kringle, a Scandinavian pastry which they somewhat resemble.

Kringle domains have been found in plasminogen, hepatocyte growth factors, prothrombin, and apolipoprotein(a).

Kringles are found throughout the blood clotting and fibrinolytic proteins. Kringle domains are believed to play a role in binding mediators (e.g., membranes, other proteins or phospholipids), and in the regulation of proteolytic activity. Kringle domains are characterised by a triple loop, 3-disulfide bridge structure, whose conformation is defined by a number of hydrogen bonds and small pieces of anti-parallel beta-sheet. They are found in a varying number of copies in some plasma proteins including prothrombin and urokinase-type plasminogen
activator, which are serine proteases belonging to MEROPS peptidase family S1A.

Human proteins containing this domain 
ATF; F12; F2; HABP2; HGF; HGFAC; KREMEN1; KREMEN2;
LPA; LPAL2; MST1; PIK3IP1; PLAT; PLAU; PLG; PRSS12; ROR1; ROR2;

References

External links
 Kringle domain in PROSITE
 KR domain entry in the SMART database
 Kringle domain cartoon, under Prothrombin Structure

Protein domains
Peripheral membrane proteins